The 1924 United States presidential election in Kentucky took place on November 4, 1924, as part of the 1924 United States presidential election. Voters chose thirteen representatives, or electors to the Electoral College, who voted for president and vice president.

Ever since the Civil War, Kentucky had been shaped politically by divisions created by that war between secessionist, Democratic counties and Unionist, Republican ones, although the state as a whole leaned Democratic throughout this era and the GOP had carried the state only once – in 1896 – between 1864 and 1920.

However, largely owing to loss of support for the Democratic Party in historically secessionist Northern Kentucky, and to a general decline in Democratic support from the high levels seen in 1920, due to female mobilization after the Nineteenth Amendment, Calvin Coolidge narrowly won Kentucky by 2.95 points against John W. Davis, winning all 13 electoral votes from the state. Kentucky is the only state that Warren G. Harding lost in the 1920 presidential election, but Coolidge won in the 1924 presidential election.

Also on the ballot was maverick Wisconsin Senator Robert M. La Follette, who carried his home state and ran second in eleven states in the Midwest and West. However, La Follette had little appeal in most of conservative Kentucky, with the only exceptions being a few rapidly unionising, labor-policy-conscious mining counties in the Eastern Coalfield and more significantly in German-influenced Northern Kentucky where he ran ahead of Davis in traditionally Democratic, highly populated Kenton and Campbell Counties – in the process playing a decisive role in handing Coolidge a closely contested election. Despite his strong showings in the two northern counties, Kentucky was overall La Follette's seventh-weakest state and, outside the former Confederacy where poll taxes prevented most of the lower classes voting, his second-weakest after pro-League of Nations Rhode Island.

Results

Results by county

Notes

References

Kentucky
1924
1924 Kentucky elections